Kordovan or Kardovan or Kerdevan or Kordavan or Kurdavan may refer to:
 Kardovan, Semnan Province
 Kordovan-e Olya, Bushehr Province
 Kordovan-e Raisi, Bushehr Province
 Kordovan-e Sofla, Bushehr Province
 Kordovan, West Azerbaijan
 Kardovan, Semnan Province